Mount Ara (Ara leř) is a polygenetic stratovolcanic cone in Armenia's Kotayk Province. The town of Zoravan and a nearby church, Gharghavank, are located along the mountain's lower slopes. The town of Yeghvard is below the mountain. 

Located north of Yerevan, the mountain has a destroyed crater and a base diameter of 9km at an altitude of 1,900m. The volcano is constructed from lava and agglomerate layers with intrusions of andesite and dacite. The slopes on the north and east are forested. One flank cone south of Arailer has erupted andesite. Andesite also appears in the former crater and lava flows spread to the Hrazdan River. One K-Ar date indicates an age of 1.3 Ma, there are two subsidiary cones Nokhut and Shakhvard.

The mountain has a high biodiversity with Sympecma paedisca, Colias aurorina, Parnassius mnemosyne rjabovi, Armenohelops armeniacus, Cylindronotus erivanus, Conizonia kalashiani, Parnassius apollo kashtshenkoi, Dorcadion kasikoporanum, Papilio alexanor orientalis, Proterebia afra hyrcana and Tetralonia macroglossa represented. Conizonia is endemic on Arailer. The ecosystem is well preserved apart from a minor threat from grazing. The Mountain also holds high variety of bird species, including Golden Eagle, Lesser Spotted Eagle, Caucasian Black Grouse, Red-billed Chough, White-throated Robin, and others. For the reason, the area was recognized as Important Bird Area.

References

Pleistocene stratovolcanoes
Subduction volcanoes
Volcanoes of Armenia
Mountains of Armenia
Polygenetic volcanoes